Halomonas stevensii is a halophilic bacteria first isolated from dialysis patients and the environment surrounding them. Its genome has been sequenced.

References

Further reading
Kim, Kwang Kyu, et al. "Halomonas stevensii sp. nov., Halomonas hamiltonii sp. nov. and Halomonas johnsoniae sp. nov., isolated from a renal care centre." International Journal of Systematic and Evolutionary Microbiology 60.2 (2010): 369–377.
Pieretti, Giuseppina, et al. "O-chain structure from the lipopolysaccharide of the human pathogen Halomonas stevensii strain S18214." Carbohydrate research346.2 (2011): 362–365.
Pieretti, Giuseppina, et al. "Characterization of the Core Oligosaccharide and the O‐Antigen Biological Repeating Unit from Halomonas stevensii Lipopolysaccharide: The First Case of O‐Antigen Linked to the Inner Core."Chemistry-A European Journal 18.12 (2012): 3729–3735.

External links

LPSN
Type strain of Halomonas stevensii at BacDive -  the Bacterial Diversity Metadatabase

Oceanospirillales
Bacteria described in 2009